The following highways are numbered 861:

United States